The National Coalition is a political coalition in Iraq.

Members
The following parties made up the coalition for the 2014 parliamentary election:
Iraqi National Accord – led by Ayad Allawi
Builders of Iraq – led by Abd Thiyab Jaza
Peace and Development Movement/Firmness – led by Abd al-Karim Ali Yassin Khalaf
Call of Freedom Gathering – led by Shalan Abd al-Jabar Ali al-Krayem
Iraqi Unity Gathering – led by Baha Nassir Hussein Salman
Iraqi National Council of Commons – led by Hassan Khudhaller Abbas Shwend
Loyalty to the Country Gathering – led by Wissam Sami Abd Allah Sulalman al-Bayat
Dialogue and Change Movement – led by Hamid Ubaid Mutlaq Omar
Movement of the Iraqi Falcons – led by Dhamr Hamid Ahmed Mahmoud
The Liberation and Building Front – led by Dhamin Iiwi Mutlaq Khalaf
Yazidi Progress Party – led by Waad Hamid Mattu Sabo
The Crescent – led by Wathab Shakir Mahmoud Aboud
Iraqi Republican Gathering – led by Hashim Jafar Yihya Hashim al-Habbobi
The National Decision List – led by Sabah Abd al-Rasoul Abd al-Ridha Rashid al-Tammimi
Iraqi Justice and Reform Movement – led by Abdullah Hamid Ujayel al-Yawer

Electoral results

Iraqi Parliament

Governorate Councils

References

2012 establishments in Iraq
Centrist parties in Asia
Liberal parties in Iraq
Political parties established in 2012
Political party alliances in Iraq